Ruy de Valladares Porto Netto (born 2 February 1980) is a Brazilian footballer who plays .

Biography
A youth product of Flamengo, Ruy Netto moved Mexico in 2002. In 2004, he returned to Rio de Janeiro for Bangu AC. He then loaned to Greek side Paniliakos from Friburguense.

In July 2005 his contract with Friburguense was extended to August 2008 and he left for Proodeftiki afterwards. His contract with Friburguense was terminated in 2006 by judicial order. In December 2006 he signed a contract until the end of 2007 Campeonato Carioca. He left for Série B side Paulista in July 2007.

In January 2008 he left for Madureira until the end of 2008 Campeonato Carioca. On 27 June he left for Macaé of Série C, but in July left the club and in August signed by Liga de Honra side Santa Clara. He wore no.10 shirt with the Portuguese side.

On 24 February 2011, Ruy Netto returned to Brazil for a third time, signed a contract with America (RJ) until the end of 2011 Campeonato Carioca.

In May 2011, he moved to Vietnam to play for Hải Phòng F.C.

In April 2014, he joined Al-Ahli for two months at the end of season. He played his first match against Al-Ittihad in semi final of King Cup of Champions. He helped Al-Ahli to win the match. The match was ended 2–1 in the favour of Al-Ahli.

References

External links
 
 Portuguese career at LPFP.pt 
 America (RJ) Profile 

Brazilian footballers
CR Flamengo footballers
Bangu Atlético Clube players
Paniliakos F.C. players
Proodeftiki F.C. players
Associação Desportiva Cabofriense players
Paulista Futebol Clube players
Madureira Esporte Clube players
Macaé Esporte Futebol Clube players
C.D. Santa Clara players
America Football Club (RJ) players
Al-Ahli Saudi FC players
Association football midfielders
Brazilian expatriate footballers
Expatriate footballers in Mexico
Expatriate footballers in Greece
Expatriate footballers in Portugal
Expatriate footballers in Vietnam
Expatriate footballers in Saudi Arabia
Brazilian expatriate sportspeople in Mexico
Brazilian expatriate sportspeople in Greece
Brazilian expatriate sportspeople in Portugal
Brazilian expatriate sportspeople in Vietnam
Brazilian expatriate sportspeople in Saudi Arabia
Footballers from Rio de Janeiro (city)
1980 births
Living people
Quissamã Futebol Clube players